The following is a list of rulers of the Kingdom of the Two Sicilies, until the fusion into the Kingdom of Italy in 1861.

History

Joachim Murat was the first king to rule a kingdom called "Two Sicilies" by the Edict of Bayonne, in 1808. Though he controlled the mainland, he never physically controlled the island of Sicily, where his Bourbon rival had fled from Naples.

After the Congress of Vienna in 1815, the title of king of Two Sicilies was adopted by Ferdinand IV of Naples in 1816. Under Ferdinand's rule, the Kingdom of Naples and the Kingdom of Sicily were unified. He had previously been king separately of both Naples and Sicily.

List of kings

House of Bourbon-Two Sicilies

References

See also
List of consorts of the Kingdom of the Two Sicilies
List of monarchs of Naples
List of monarchs of Sicily
List of Counts of Apulia and Calabria
House of Bourbon-Two Sicilies
Descendants of Charles III of Spain
House of Bourbon

 
List

et:Mõlema Sitsiilia kuningriik#Monarhia